Memories of an Old Friend is a compilation album by Australian singer-songwriter duo Angus & Julia Stone. It was released in December 2010 in Australia through EMI Music Australia and peaked at number 57 on the ARIA Charts in February 2011.

Track listing

Charts

Release history

References

2010 compilation albums
Compilation albums by Australian artists
Angus & Julia Stone albums